Idriss Ech-Chergui (born 22 May 1985) is a professional footballer who plays as an attacking midfielder for Championnat National 2 club Hyères. Born in France, he holds both Algerian and French citizenship.

Career

Early career
Born in Saint-Chamond, Loire, Ech-Chergui came up through the junior ranks at Saint-Étienne but failed to land a professional contract with the club after a horrific injury. He later played for Bayonne, Sète and Nîmes.

JS Kabylie
On 7 October 2009, Ech-Chergui was linked with a move to Algerian side JS Kabylie, and five days later he started his trial with the club. On 22 October 2009 he returned to the club to finalize the details of his contract.

On 22 July 2010, Ech-Chergui was released from the club for indiscipline.

Montreal Impact
On 10 February 2011, Ech-Chergui signed a one-year deal with the Montreal Impact. After the one-year deal expired, he left Montreal, and he returned to France.

Martigues
On 6 January 2012, he signed for Championnat National club Martigues following a short trial period.

References

External links
 

1985 births
Living people
People from Saint-Chamond
Sportspeople from Loire (department)
Association football midfielders
Algerian footballers
French footballers
Ligue 2 players
Championnat National players
North American Soccer League players
Nîmes Olympique players
AS Saint-Étienne players
FC Sète 34 players
JS Kabylie players
Montreal Impact (1992–2011) players
FC Martigues players
Luzenac AP players
Paris FC players
SC Toulon players
Hyères FC players
Algerian expatriate footballers
French expatriate footballers
French sportspeople of Algerian descent
French expatriate sportspeople in Algeria
Algerian expatriate sportspeople in Canada
French expatriate sportspeople in Canada
Expatriate soccer players in Canada
Footballers from Auvergne-Rhône-Alpes